One Life is a 1958 French drama film directed by Alexandre Astruc, starring Maria Schell and Christian Marquand. It is also known as End of Desire in the United States. It is set in the 19th century and tells the story of the unhappy marriage between an idealistic woman of aristocratic background and a cynical man. The film is based on the novel Une Vie by Guy de Maupassant. It was shown in competition at the 19th Venice International Film Festival. It had 2,315,098 admissions in France.

The song "Une Vie", written by Roman Vlad and Marc Lanjean, was released as a single by Maria Schell in 1958, and covered by Eddie Barclay's big band in 1959.

Cast
 Maria Schell as Jeanne Dandieu
 Christian Marquand as Julien de Lamare
 Ivan Desny as De Fourcheville
 Pascale Petit as Rosalie
 Antonella Lualdi as Gilberte de Fourcheville
 Louis Arbessier as M. Dandieu
 Marie-Hélène Dasté as Mme. Dandieu
 Michel de Slubicki as Paul de Lamare
 Andrée Tainsy as Ludivine

References

External links

1958 drama films
1958 films
Films based on French novels
Films based on works by Guy de Maupassant
Films directed by Alexandre Astruc
Films set in the 19th century
French drama films
1950s French-language films
1950s French films